Dimsdale is a residential area of Wishaw in North Lanarkshire, Scotland. It is located next to fellow Wishaw suburbs Greenhead and Waterloo.

Dimsdale is somewhat of a modern housing district of Wishaw, as a lot of new low-density houses have recently been built in the area. Dimsdale is located between the A721 (that connects to Wishaw Main Street and the busy A71 road), and the Wishaw Deviation Line (that connects to the West Coast Main Line, though no passenger service trains stop in the suburb).

Dimsdale was the site of an old hospital that mainly focused on tuberculosis and fever from the 1920s until around 1965. However this was disused and demolished before 1990. It is unknown what exact year the building was built and demolished but it appears in OS maps as far back as the 1890s

References

External links
Location of Dimsdale on google maps

Areas of Wishaw